Vice Admiral Paul Martin Bennett,  is a former senior Royal Navy officer.

Naval career
Educated at Newcastle University, Bennett joined the Royal Navy in 1985. He trained as a navigator before being given command the minehunter  in 1998, the destroyer  in 1999 and the destroyer  in 2008. He became Commander Amphibious Task Group in May 2009, Commodore Naval Personnel Strategy in January 2011 and Director of the Development, Concepts and Doctrine Centre in February 2013. After that he became Chief of Staff at Joint Forces Command in September 2013 and Assistant Chief of Naval Staff (Capability) and Controller of the Navy in May 2016. He was made Commander United Kingdom Maritime Forces in November 2017, which was followed by appointment as Chief of Staff of NATO Allied Command Transformation in July 2018. He was succeeded by Vice Admiral Guy Robinson in September 2021, and subsequently retired in February 2022.

Bennett was appointed an Officer of the Order of the British Empire in the 2007 Birthday Honours, and a Companion of the Order of the Bath in the 2016 Birthday Honours.

References

|-

Year of birth missing (living people)
Living people
Royal Navy vice admirals
Officers of the Order of the British Empire
Alumni of Newcastle University
Companions of the Order of the Bath
Royal Navy personnel of the Iraq War